Gould Island may refer to:

 Gould Island (Rhode Island), United States 
 Gould Island (Western Australia), Australia